Sally Hughes may refer to

 Sally Hughes-Schrader (1895–1984), Professor of Zoology at Duke University (1962-1966)

You may be looking for
 Sali Hughes, Welsh journalist